Caloptilia nomurai is a moth of the family Gracillariidae. It is known from Brunei, Thailand and Vietnam.

References

nomurai
Moths of Asia
Moths described in 1993